Pacifica was a statue created by Ralph Stackpole for the 1939–1940 Golden Gate International Exposition held on Treasure Island in the San Francisco Bay. Stackpole's largest sculpture, it towered  over the entrance to the Cavalcade of the Golden West in the Court of Pacifica. The Court of Pacifica was dedicated to the heroic explorers of Pacific Ocean territories. Pacifica was the theme statue for the exposition, representing world peace, neighborliness, and the power of a unified Pacific coast.

Development
It took Stackpole two years to complete the statue as it started out as a three inch figure. The model was then divided into cross sections.

Each cross section was enlarged eight-fold though a process using a pantograph. Scaffolding was set up and prepared for the precise assembly of the enlarged sections. Iron was used for supports, bent and shaped around the proper contours of the statue. Next, mesh wire was layered over the entire iron frame, and then covered in a final blanket of plaster. Such a construction was always meant for temporary placement.

By November 1938, when Life photographer Alfred Eisenstaedt was capturing images to promote the event, Pacifica was ready for his camera. The magazine carried the image of this, Stackpole's most monumental work, "a peaceful, contemplative, almost prayer-like female figure".

Pacifica at the Golden Gate International Exposition
Pacifica was physically the biggest and most conspicuous statue at the exposition. She was placed in front of a  metal prayer curtain that had a backdrop of stars made of metal and small tubes that would make sound when met with a breeze. In front of the statue, in the center of the court, was a circular fountain surrounded by the works of eight different sculptors of figures representing people living on shores of the Pacific.

Presentation

Lighting
The statue was lit by two 1500 watt underwater floodlights. The giant spotlights gave Pacifica a look of "regal splendor." The backdrop, or Great Window, was lit by 75 amber, 150 red, and 300 blue floodlights, each 200 watts, all controlled by a thyratron. This gave the entire court a very colorful and mystical appearance after dark. "The contrast brought the great figure to life, as if it were about to walk down the esplanade into the Court of the Seven Seas."

Flowers
Orange calendulas were in full bloom around the statue, as well as red, yellow, and purple ranunculus and anemones which were said at the time to be very fragrant and added a romantic edge to the court.

Destruction
From 1939 to 1940, some 16 million visitors came to the exposition. The United States Navy purchased the island as a naval base in 1941, and Pacifica was demolished along with most other exposition structures.

After the exposition, Stackpole proposed that the sculpture be recast in a more permanent form—steel, stone or concrete—and positioned prominently on an island in the San Francisco Bay, perhaps Alcatraz or Angel Island, in a manner similar to the Statue of Liberty in New York Harbor. The plan was not seriously considered by civic leaders whose attention was on the events that soon brought the U.S. into direct involvement with World War II.

Pacifica was demolished by the US Navy on January 22, 1941.

Pacifica II
Currently, a non-profit organization called The Pacifica II Statue Project is working to recreate and resurrect Pacifica on Treasure Island. There is currently an  replica of Pacifica at City College of San Francisco Ocean Campus, 50 Phelan Avenue in the garden next to the Diego Rivera Theater.

References

External links
 Pacifica is Back

Colossal statues in the United States
Golden Gate International Exposition
Public art in the United States
World's fair sculptures
Demolished buildings and structures in San Francisco
Buildings and structures demolished in 1941